Sir Frederic William Eggleston (17 October 1875 – 12 November 1954) was an Australian lawyer, politician, diplomat and writer.

Early life
The eldest son of lawyer John Waterhouse Eggleston and his wife, Emily, his grandfather was the Methodist minister Rev. John Eggleston. His maternal grandparents were also Methodists. His mother died early in his life in 1884 and his father married Ada Crouch in 1887.

Career
Eggleston was on good terms with John Latham and in 1902 founded a group known as the 'Boobooks' with him. Eggleston was elected to the Victorian Legislative Assembly as the member for Member for St Kilda in 1920 and was appointed Attorney-General of Victoria and Solicitor-General of Victoria (19241927) in the government of John Allan.

Frederic Eggleston was appointed Australia's first Ambassador to China in 1941. For his role as Chairman of the Commonwealth Grants Commission, in the 1941 King's Birthday honours he was made a Knight Bachelor.

Later life
At the end of 1952 he published his Reflections of an Australian Liberal (F. W. Cheshire). He died in 1954.

References

 

 
 

 
 

1875 births
1954 deaths
Ambassadors of Australia to China
Ambassadors of Australia to the United States
Australian legal scholars
Australian Methodists
Australian Knights Bachelor
Australian military personnel of World War I
Nationalist Party of Australia members of the Parliament of Victoria
Journalists from Melbourne
Lawyers from Melbourne
Members of the Victorian Legislative Assembly
Mayors of places in Victoria (Australia)
Attorneys-General of Victoria
Solicitors-General of Victoria
People from Brunswick, Victoria
Military personnel from Melbourne
University of Melbourne alumni politicians